Slaughter Creek is a  long 3rd order tributary to Cedar Creek in Sussex County, Delaware.

Variant names
According to the Geographic Names Information System, it has also been known historically as:  
Slaughter Beach Canal
Slaughter Neck Ditch

Course
Slaughter Creek rises on the Church Branch and North Prong divide about 0.25 miles northwest of Jefferson Crossroads, Delaware.  Slaughter Creek then flows east and makes a turn northwest to meet Cedar Creek west of Slaughter Beach.

Watershed
Slaughter Creek drains  of area, receives about 45.5 in/year of precipitation, has a topographic wetness index of 798.73 and is about 4% forested.

References

External links
Prime Hook National Wildlife Refuge

Rivers of Delaware
Rivers of Sussex County, Delaware
Tributaries of Delaware Bay